Jacabamba (possibly from Quechua qaqa rock, pampa a large plain, "rock plain") is a  mountain in the Cordillera Blanca in the Andes of Peru. It is situated in the Ancash Region, Asunción Province, Chacas District, in the Carhuaz Province, Marcará District, and in the Huari Province, Huari District. Jacabamba lies between mount Copap to the north and Chinchey to the south. Lake Rurichinchay lies at its feet.

The rivers Jacabamba and Rurichinchay originate on the east side of the mountain and flow to the south-west. They belong to the watershed of the Marañón River.

References

Mountains of Peru
Mountains of Ancash Region